Stéphane Javelle (Lyon, 16 November 1864 – 3 August 1917) was a French astronomer. Since 1888 he worked assisting Henri Perrotin at the Nice Observatory, and observed 1431 objects published in the Index Catalogue.  He initially worked as an accountant before his employer's friend, Louis Thollon recommended him to Perrotin. He was awarded the Valz Prize in 1910 by the French Academy of Sciences.

References

External links
 Stéphane Javelle @ Wolfgang Steinicke's website
 S. Javelle @ Astrophysics Data System

1864 births
1917 deaths
19th-century French astronomers
Scientists from Lyon
Recipients of the Lalande Prize
20th-century French astronomers